Hung Wai Ching (August 1, 1905  February 9, 2002) was a Chinese American businessman. He founded the Varsity Victory Volunteers, and was one of the founders of Aloha Airlines.

Early life and education 
Ching was born in Honolulu on August 1, 1905. His parents were immigrants from China. He attended McKinley High School and graduated in 1924. He graduated from the University of Hawaii in 1928, then attended Union Theological Seminary. In 1932 he earned a master's degree from Yale Divinity School. He also worked at the Nuuanu YMCA from 1928 to 1938, then as served as secretary at the Atherton YMCA near the University of Hawaii.

Career 
During World War II Ching was invited to be part of the Council for Interracial Unity's Morale Division with Shigeo Yoshida and Charles Loomis. This organization was meant to serve as a bridge between the civilian community and the military. They spoke out about the loyalty of Japanese Americans and prevented the wholesale incarceration of Japanese people in Hawaii. In 1943 Ching met with Eleanor and Franklin Roosevelt to report on race conditions in Hawaii and praise the decision not to incarcerate every Japanese person in Hawaii.

When all Japanese soldiers were removed from the Hawaii Territorial Guard in 1942, Ching advocated for a labor battalion to be founded so that these men could still assist the war effort. This organization was called the Varsity Victory Volunteers. Ching continued to support and advocate for these men after the 442nd Regimental Combat Team was founded. When the war ended, Ching helped veterans get jobs and get scholarships to finish their educations. Ching also supported the Hawaii Defense Volunteers, an organization that was similar to the Varsity Victory Volunteers, but with volunteers from the Filipino, Chinese, Korean, and Puerto Rican communities.

After the war, Ching became a real estate broker. He was also one of the founders of Aloha Airlines alongside his brother Hung Wo, and served as a director for 25 years. Ching served as director or trustee of several local businesses and organizations. He died of cancer on February 9, 2002.

References 

1905 births
2002 deaths
American people of Chinese descent
20th-century American businesspeople
University of Hawaiʻi at Mānoa alumni
Yale Divinity School alumni
People from Honolulu